The shmoo (plural: shmoos, also shmoon) is a fictional cartoon creature created by Al Capp (1909–1979); the character first appeared in the comic strip Li'l Abner on August 31, 1948. The popular character has gone on to influence pop culture, language, geopolitics, human history, and even science.


Description
A shmoo is shaped like a plump bowling pin with stubby legs. It has smooth skin, eyebrows, and sparse whiskers—but no arms, nose, or ears. Its feet are short and round, but dexterous, as the shmoo's comic book adventures make clear. It has a rich gamut of facial expressions and often expresses love by exuding hearts over its head. Cartoonist Al Capp ascribed to the shmoo the following curious characteristics:
 They reproduce asexually and are incredibly prolific, multiplying faster than rabbits. They require no sustenance other than air.
 Shmoos are delicious to eat, and are eager to be eaten. If a human looks at one hungrily, it will happily immolate itself—either by jumping into a frying pan, after which they taste like chicken, or into a broiling pan, after which they taste like steak. When roasted they taste like pork, and when baked they taste like catfish. Raw, they taste like oysters on the half-shell.
 They also produce eggs (neatly packaged), milk (bottled, grade-A), and butter—no churning required. Their pelts make perfect bootleather or house timbers, depending on how thick one slices them.
 They have no bones, so there's absolutely no waste. Their eyes make the best suspender buttons, and their whiskers make perfect toothpicks. In short, they are simply the perfect ideal of a subsistence agricultural herd animal.
 Naturally gentle, they require minimal care and are ideal playmates for young children. The frolicking of shmoos is so entertaining (such as their staged "shmoosical comedies") that people no longer feel the need to watch television or go to the movies.
 Some of the tastier varieties of shmoo are more difficult to catch, however. Usually shmoo hunters, now a sport in some parts of the country, use a paper bag, flashlight, and stick to capture their shmoos. At night the light stuns them, then they may be whacked in the head with the stick and put in the bag for frying up later on.

The original story

In a sequence beginning in late August 1948, Li'l Abner discovers the shmoos when he ventures into the forbidden "Valley of the Shmoon" following the mysterious and musical sound they make (from which their name derives). Abner is thrown off a cliff and into the valley below by a primitive "large gal" (as he addresses her), whose job is to guard the valley. There, against the frantic protestations of a naked, heavily bearded old man who shepherds the shmoos, Abner befriends the strange and charming creatures. "Shmoos", the old man warns, "is the greatest menace to hoomanity th' world has evah known!" "Thass becuz they is so bad, huh?" asks Li'l Abner. "No, stupid", answers the man—and then encapsulates one of life's profound paradoxes: "It's because they's so good!!".

Having discovered their value ("Wif these around, nobody won't nevah havta work no more!!"), Abner leads the shmoos out of the valley—where they become a sensation in Dogpatch and, quickly, the rest of the world. Captains of industry such as J. Roaringham Fatback, the "Pork King", become alarmed as sales of nearly all products decline, and in a series of images reminiscent of the Wall Street Crash of 1929, the "Shmoo Crisis" unfolds. On Fatback's orders, a corrupt exterminator orders out "Shmooicide Squads" to wipe out the shmoos with a variety of firearms, which is depicted in a macabre and comically graphic sequence, with a tearful Li'l Abner misguidedly saluting the supposed "authority" of the extermination squads.

After the shmoos have been eliminated, Dogpatch's extortionate grocer Soft-Hearted John is seen cackling as he displays his wares—rotting meat and produce: "Now them mizzuble starvin' rats has t'come crawlin t'me fo' the necessities o' life!! They complained 'bout mah prices befo'!! Wait'll they see th' new ones!!". The exterminator congratulates him.

However, it is soon discovered that Abner has secretly saved two shmoos, a "boy" and a "girl". The boy shmoo, as a Dogpatch native, is required to run from the girl shmoo in the annual Sadie Hawkins Day race. (Shmoos usually are portrayed as gender-neutral, although Capp sidesteps this issue for this sequence to allow the comic plot twist.) When "he" is caught by "her", in accordance with the rules of the race, they are joined in marriage by Marryin' Sam (whom they "pay" with a dozen eggs, two pounds of butter, and six cupcakes with chocolate frosting—all of which Sam reckons to be worth about 98 cents in 1948). The already expanding shmoo family is last seen returning toward the Valley of the Shmoon.

The sequence, which ended just before Christmas of 1948, was massively popular, both as a commentary on the state of society and a classic allegory of greed and corruption tarnishing all that is good and innocent in the world. The Shmoo caused an unexpected national sensation, and set the stage for a major licensing phenomenon. In their very few subsequent appearances in Li'l Abner, shmoos also are identified by the U.S. military as a major threat to national security.

Origins
Al Capp offered his version of the origin of the Shmoo in a wryly satirical article, "I Don't Like Shmoos", in Cosmopolitan (June 1949):

Capp introduced many other allegorical creatures in Li'l Abner over the years—including Bald Iggles, Kigmies, Nogoodniks, Mimikniks, the Money Ha-Ha, Shminks, Abominable Snow-Hams, Gobbleglops, Shtunks and Bashful Bulganiks, among others. Each one highlighted another disquieting facet of human nature—but none have ever had quite the same cultural impact as the Shmoo. According to publisher Denis Kitchen: "For the rest of his career Capp got countless letters [from] people begging him to bring the Shmoo back. Periodically he would do it but each time it ended the same way—with the Shmoo being too good for humanity, and he had to essentially exterminate them again. But there was always one or two who would survive for future plot twists..."

Etymology
The origin of Capp's word "shmoo" has been the subject of linguistic consideration by scholars for decades.

It has been speculated by that shmoo was a thinly veiled phallic symbol, and that the name derives from Yiddish schmuck (schmo) meaning ‘male genitalia’ or a ‘fool, contemptuous person’ (Arthur Asa Berger and Allan H. Orrick of Johns Hopkins). Even prior to these two academics, Thomas Pyles (U. Florida) had favored the shmuck etymology over the derivation from the Yiddish schmu (‘profit’), suggested by Leo Spitzer.

Spitzer noted the shmoo's providential characteristics (providing eggs and milk) in arguing his hypothesis, further explaining that in Yiddish schmu specifically connoted "illicit profit", and that the word also giving rise to term schmus ‘tale, gossip’, whose verb form schmusen or ‘shmoosing’ (schmooze) has become familiar even to non-Jews. Lilian Mermin Feinsilver assessed this association with shmu ‘illicit profit’ as "pertinent", together with the observation that shmue was a taboo Yiddish term for the uterus.

It is one of many Yiddish slang variations that would find their way into Li'l Abner. Revealing an important key to the story, Al Capp wrote that the Shmoo metaphorically represented the limitless bounty of the Earth in all its richness—in essence, Mother Nature herself. In Li'l Abner's words, "Shmoos hain't make believe. The hull [whole] earth is one!!"

Analysis

"Capp is at his allegorical best in the epics of the Shmoos, and later, the Kigmies", wrote comic strip historian Jerry Robinson (in The Comics: An Illustrated History of Comic Strip Art, 1974). "Shmoos are the world's most amiable creatures, supplying all man's needs. Like a fertility myth gone berserk, they reproduced so prodigiously they threatened to wreck the economy"—if not western civilization as we know it, and ultimately society itself.

Superficially, the Shmoo story concerns a cuddly creature that desires nothing more than to be a boon to humans. Although initially Capp denied or avoided discussion of any satirical intentions ("If the Shmoo fits", he proclaimed, "wear it!"), he was widely seen to be using clever subtext. The story has social, ethical, and philosophical implications that continue to invite analysis into the 21st Century. During the remainder of his life, Capp was seldom interviewed without reference to the nature of the Shmoo story.

The mythic tale ends on a deliberately ironic note. Shmoos are officially declared a menace, and systematically hunted down and slaughtered—because they were deemed "bad for business". The much-copied story line was a parable that was interpreted in many different ways at the outset of the Cold War. Al Capp was even invited to go on a radio show to debate socialist Norman Thomas on the effect of the Shmoo on modern capitalism.

"After it came out both the left and the right attacked the Shmoo", according to publisher Denis Kitchen. "Communists thought he was making fun of socialism and Marxism. The right wing thought he was making fun of capitalism and the American way. Capp caught flak from both sides. For him it was an apolitical morality tale about human nature... I think [the Shmoo] was one of those bursts of genius. He was a genius, there's no question about that."

Reception
The Shmoo inspired hundreds of "Shmoo clubs" all over North America. College students—who had made Capp's invented idea of the Sadie Hawkins dance a universally adopted tradition—flocked to the Shmoo as well. One school, the University of Bridgeport, even launched the "American Society for the Advancement of the Shmoo" in early 1949.

Licensing history

An unexpected—and virtually unprecedented—postwar merchandising phenomenon followed Capp's introduction of the Shmoo in Li'l Abner. As in the strip, shmoos suddenly appeared to be everywhere in 1949 and 1950—including a Time cover story. They also garnered nearly a full page of coverage (under "Economics") in the Time International section. Major articles also ran in Newsweek, Life, The New Republic, and countless other publications and newspapers. Virtually overnight, as a Life headline put it, "The U.S. Becomes Shmoo-Struck!"

Toys and consumer products

Shmoo dolls, clocks, watches, jewelry, earmuffs, wallpaper, fishing lures, air fresheners, soap, ice cream, balloons, ashtrays, toys, games, Halloween masks, salt and pepper shakers, decals, pinbacks, tumblers, coin banks, greeting cards, planters, neckties, suspenders, belts, curtains, fountain pens, and other shmoo paraphernalia were produced. A garment factory in Baltimore turned out a whole line of shmoo apparel, including "Shmooveralls". In 1948, people danced to the Shmoo Rhumba and the Shmoo Polka. The Shmoo briefly entered everyday language through such phrases as "What's Shmoo?" and "Happy Shmoo Year!"

Close to a hundred licensed shmoo products from 75 different manufacturers were produced in less than a year, some of which sold five million units each. In a single year, shmoo merchandise generated more than $25 million in sales in 1948 dollars (equivalent to $ million in ).

The Shmoo was so popular it even replaced Walt Disney's Mickey Mouse as the face of the Children's Savings Bond, issued by the U.S. Treasury Department in 1949. The valid document was colorfully illustrated with Capp's character, and promoted by the Federal Government of the United States with a $16 million advertising campaign budget. According to one article at the time, the Shmoo showed "Thrift, loyalty, trust, duty, truth, and common cents [that] add up to aid to his nation". Al Capp accompanied President Harry S. Truman at the bond's unveiling ceremony.

Comic books and reprints
The Life and Times of the Shmoo (1948), a paperback collection of the original sequence, was a bestseller for Simon & Schuster and became the first cartoon book to achieve serious literary attention. Distributed to small town magazine racks, it sold 700,000 copies in its first year of publication alone. It was reviewed coast to coast alongside Dwight Eisenhower's Crusade in Europe (the other big publication at the time).

The original book and its sequel, The Return of the Shmoo (1959), have been collected in print many times since—most recently in 2002—always to high sales figures.

There was also a separate line of comic books, Al Capp's Shmoo Comics (featuring Washable Jones), published by the Capp family-owned Toby Press. Comics historian and Li'l Abner expert Denis Kitchen recently edited a complete collection of all five original Shmoo Comics, from 1949 and 1950. The book was published by Dark Horse Comics in 2008. Kitchen edited a second Shmoo-related volume for Dark Horse in 2011, on the history of the character in newspaper strips, collectibles, and memorabilia.

Recordings and sheet music

Recordings and published sheet music related to the Shmoos include:

 The Shmoo Sings with Earl Rogers (1948) 78 rpm / Allegro
 The Shmoo Club b/w The Shmoo Is Clean, the Shmoo Is Neat with Gerald Marks and Justin Stone (1949) 78 rpm / Music You Enjoy, Inc.
 The Snuggable, Huggable Shmoo b/w The Shmoo Doesn't Cost a Cent with Gerald Marks and Justin Stone (1949) 78 rpm / Music You Enjoy, Inc.
 Shmoo Lesson b/w A Shmoo Can Do Most Anything with Gerald Marks and Justin Stone (1949) 78 rpm / Music You Enjoy, Inc.
 The Shmoo Song (1948) Composed by Jule Styne & John Jacob Loeb / Harvey Music Corp.
 Shmoo Songs (1949) Composed by Gerald Marks / Bristol Music Corp.
 The Kigmy Song (1949) Composed by Joe Rosenield & Fay Tishman / Town and Country Music Co.

Animation and puppetry
Originally, shmoos were meant to be included in the 1956 Broadway Li'l Abner musical, employing stage puppetry. Reportedly, the idea was abandoned in the development stage by the producers, however, for reasons of practicality. A variation of the character had appeared earlier as a marionette puppet on television. "Shmoozer", a talking shmoo with an anthropomorphic human body, was a recurring sidekick character on Fearless Fosdick, a short-lived puppet series that aired on NBC-TV in 1952.

After Capp's death in 1979, the Shmoo gained its own animated series as part of Fred and Barney Meet the Shmoo (which consisted of reruns of The New Fred and Barney Show mixed with the Shmoo's own cartoons; the two separate types of characters didn't "meet", however). The characters did meet, however, in the early 1980s Flintstones spin-off The Flintstone Comedy Show. The Shmoo appeared, incongruously, in the segment Bedrock Cops as a police officer alongside part-time officers Fred Flintstone and Barney Rubble. Needless to add, this Shmoo had little relationship to the L'il Abner character, other than a superficial appearance. A later Hanna-Barbera venture, The New Shmoo, featured the character as an (inexplicably) shape-shifting mascot of Mighty Mysteries Comics, a group of teens who solve Scooby-Doo-like mysteries. In this series the Shmoo could metamorphose magically into any shape at will—like Tom Terrific. None of these revisionist revivals of the venerable character was particularly successful.

In popular culture
 Frank Sinatra, who was frequently spoofed by Al Capp in Li'l Abner, has a line in the MGM musical On the Town (1949) about cops "multiplyin' like shmoos!"
 Florence King refers to owning a ceramic shmoo, which she threw out of her window after reading the books of Ayn Rand.
 In the 1990 movie Book of Love, the character Crutch wins a stuffed shmoo at a carnival.
 In the M*A*S*H television episode "Who Knew?", Colonel Potter (played by Harry Morgan) displays an inflatable shmoo toy in his office that he purchased for his grandson.
 In Larry Niven's Known Space stories, an alien species known as the Bandersnatch, also edible and intelligent, is described as being "smooth as a shmoo".
 In the novel The Forge of God by Greg Bear, "Shmoo" is the name humans give to the race of robots that visits Earth, due to their similar shape.
 Some overlapping similarities exist between shmoos and tribbles—the multitudinous alien creatures featured in a 1967 television episode from the original Star Trek. Like shmoos, tribbles also reproduced at such an alarming rate, they threatened ecological disaster. However, David Gerrold—who wrote "The Trouble with Tribbles"—drew his inspiration from an historical event: Australia's environmentally destructive rabbit overpopulation.
 The characters Gleep and Gloop—two protoplastic creatures from the Hanna-Barbera Saturday morning animated cartoon series The Herculoids—were clearly inspired by (and are sometimes mistaken for) shmoos.
 French artists Etienne Chambaud and David Jourdan have written "Economie de l'abondance ou La courte vie et les jours heureux", a new adventure of Jacques le fataliste et son maître from Diderot, based on the discovery by Jacques of the Shmoo.
 In the 2006 film Lucky Number Slevin, the character known only as "The Boss" (played by Morgan Freeman) refers to the Shmoo, recounting its original features as a source of plenty (in a monologue taken from an old Li'l Abner comic).
 The Marxist political philosopher Gerald Cohen used the story of the Shmoo to illustrate his objections to capitalism in an episode of Opinions.
 The Simpsons uses a statue of the Shmoo to replace the giant phallic statue from the film A Clockwork Orange in the episode "Treehouse of Horror XXV".
 The Shmoo is featured in "Bedrock Cops" as a friend and partner of Fred Flintstone and Barney Rubble.
 In all non-Japanese versions of the video game Castlevania: Symphony of the Night, there is an enemy monster called "Schmoo" (in the original Japanese version it is an Obake called "Kyuu," an homage to the character in the manga, Obake no Q-tarō), which is an homage to The Shmoo. Schmoos appear in the Forbidden Library and they have a rare chance of dropping the Crissaegrim upon death, one of the most powerful weapons in the game.
 During the Soviet Union's blockade of West Berlin, Germany in 1948, candy-filled shmoos were air-dropped to hungry West Berliners from transport planes by America's 17th Military Airport Squadron. The commanders of the Berlin airlift had cabled Capp, requesting the inflatable shmoos as part of Operation: Little Vittles. "When the candy-chocked shmoos were dropped, a near-riot resulted...."
 Shmoos invaded the 1948 presidential election, as challenger Thomas Dewey accused incumbent Harry S. Truman of "promising everything, including the Shmoo!"
 Capp periodically reintroduced the Shmoos in Li'l Abner, sometimes with significant variations. "Bad" Shmoos (called "Nogoodniks") debuted in a series of Sunday strips in 1949. The nasty cousin of the good-natured Shmoo, Nogoodniks were a sickly shade of green, and had "li'l red eyes, sharp yaller teeth, an' a dirty look". Frequently sporting 5 o'clock shadows, eye patches, scars, bandages, and other ruffian attributes—they devoured "good" Shmoos, were the sworn enemies of "hoomanity", and wreaked havoc on Dogpatch.
 In the ABC sitcom The Goldbergs, Beverley Goldberg endearingly refers to her children as Shmoos.
 The product of artist Mark Gonzale, Adidas sells a version of its Trefoil logo (termed the Shmoofoil), that is patterned after the Shmoo.

Eponyms

The term "shmoo" has entered the English language, defining highly technical concepts in at least four separate fields of science:
 "Shmoo plot" is a technical term relating to the graphical display of test results in electrical engineering, dating back at least to 1966. The name most likely arose because the shape of the two-dimensional plots often resembled a shmoo. The term is also a verb: to "shmoo" means to run the test.
 In microbiology, the shmoo's uncanny resemblance to budding yeast—combined with its near-limitless usefulness—has led to the character's adoption as a mascot of sorts for scientists studying yeast as a model organism for genetics and cell biology. In fact, the cellular bulge that is produced by a haploid yeast cell as a response to a pheromone from the opposite mating type (either  or α-factor) is referred to as a "shmoo", because cells that are undergoing mating and present this particular structure resemble the cartoon character. The whole process is known to biologists as "shmooing". Shmoos are essential; without them, we would have neither bread nor beer. The word "shmoo" has appeared in nearly 700 science publications since 1974; it is used in labs studying the bread- and beer-making species Saccharomyces cerevisiae.
 Echinoderm biologists use "shmoo" (often misspelled "schmoo") to refer to a very simple, highly derived, blob-shaped larva found in some sea urchins (e.g. Wray 1996).
 In bird collections, skin specimens prepared without bills are often called "shmoos".
 It has been used in discussions of socioeconomics, for instance. In economics, a "widget" is any material good that is produced through labor (extracted, refined, manufactured, or assembled) from a finite resource—in contrast to a "shmoo", which is a material good that reproduces itself and is captured or bred as an economic activity (the original shmoo lives and reproduces without requiring any material sustenance). "If shmoos really existed, they would be a 'free good'." Erik Olin Wright uses the "parable of the shmoo" to introduce discussion of class structure and economics.
 In the field of particle physics, "shmoo" refers to a high energy cosmic ray survey instrument used at the Los Alamos National Laboratory for the Cygnus X-3 Sky Survey performed at the LAMPF (Los Alamos Meson Physics Facility) grounds. At one time, more than one hundred white "shmoo" detectors were sprinkled around the accelerator beamstop area and adjacent mesa to capture subatomic cosmic ray particles emitted from the Cygnus constellation. The detectors housed scintillators and photomultipliers in an array that gave the detector its distinctive shmoo shape. The particle accelerator Tevatron at Fermilab houses superconducting magnets that produce ice formations that also resembled shmoos.
 In medicine, the "Shmoo sign" refers to the appearance of a prominent, rounded left ventricle and dilated aorta on a plain AP chest radiograph, giving the appearance of a Shmoo.
 In environmental law, Section 3004(u) of the Resource Conservation and Recovery Act (RCRA, 42 U.S. Code Section 6924(u)) requires all operators of permitted units for the treatment, storage or disposal (TSD) of hazardous wastes to conduct a search for all Solid Waste Management Units (SWMUs) on the operator's contiguous property, outside of the permitted TSD Unit.  Environmental professionals generally pronounce the acronym SWMU as "Shmoo" and the search for SWMUs, called a RCRA Facility Assessment, is called a "Shmoo hunt".  Each SWMU is then assessed to determine whether it has leaked hazardous waste into the environment.  All such leaks must be cleaned up as a requirement of the permit to operate the TSD Unit.  The process is called RCRA Corrective Action.

Applied conversely, the shmoo has been cited as a hypothetical example of the potential falsifiability of natural selection as a key driving mechanism of biological evolution. That is, such a poorly adapted species could not possibly evolve via natural selection, so if it were to exist, it would falsify the theory.

See also 
 Eugene the Jeep

Explanatory notes

References

Further reading
 Capp, Al, The Life and Times of the Shmoo (1948) Simon & Schuster
 Capp, Al, "There Is a Real Shmoo" (New Republic, 21 March 1949)
 Capp, Al, "I Don't Like Shmoos" (Cosmopolitan, June 1949)
 Al Capp Studios, Al Capp's Shmoo Comics (1949–1950) 5 issues (Toby Press)
 Al Capp Studios, Al Capp's Shmoo in Washable Jones' Travels (1950) (Oxydol premium)
 Al Capp Studios, Washable Jones and the Shmoo (1953) (Toby Press)
 Capp, Al, Al Capp's Bald Iggle: The Life It Ruins May Be Your Own (1956) Simon & Schuster
 Capp, Al, The Return of the Shmoo (1959) Simon & Schuster
 Capp, Al, Charlie Mensuel #2 (March 1969) (A French monthly periodical devoted to comics)
 Capp, Al, The Best of Li'l Abner (1978) Holt, Rinehart & Winston 
 Capp, Al, Li'l Abner: Reuben Award Winner Series Book 1 (1985) Blackthorne
 Capp, Al, Li'l Abner Dailies: 1948 Vol. 14 (1992) Kitchen Sink Press 
 Capp, Al, Li'l Abner Dailies: 1949 Vol. 15 (1992) Kitchen Sink 
 Capp, Al, Li'l Abner Dailies: 1956 Vol. 22 (1995) Kitchen Sink 
 Capp, Al, Li'l Abner Dailies: 1959 Vol. 25 (1997) Kitchen Sink 
 Capp, Al, The Short Life and Happy Times of the Shmoo (2002) Overlook Press 
 Capp, Al, Al Capp's Li'l Abner: The Frazetta Years – 4 volumes (2003, 2004) Dark Horse Comics
 Al Capp Studios, Al Capp's Complete Shmoo: The Comic Books (2008) Dark Horse 
 Capp, Al, Al Capp's Complete Shmoo Vol. 2: The Newspaper Strips (2011) Dark Horse

External links

American comics characters
Li'l Abner characters
Characters created by Al Capp
American satire
Comics characters introduced in 1948
Fictional life forms
The Flintstones characters